Vincenza Garelli della Morea née Valeggio (Countess de Cardenas; 1859 -   after 1924) was an Italian pianist and composer. She also used the pseudonym Centa della Morea.

Biography
Vincenza Garelli della Morea was born in Valeggio, in the  province of Pavia, and studied in Turin with Carlo Pedrotti and Giovanni Bolzoni, later continuing her studies with Giovanni Sgambati. She married the Count de Cardenas and lived in Milan, where she attended the salon of Countess Maffei. In 1888 she moved to Rome.

Works
Della Morea composed three pantomimes, operettas, orchestral works, a string quartet and a number of songs and piano pieces. Selected compositions include:
Incantesimo, operetta, libretto by G. Drovetti, 1915
Il viaggio dei Perrichon, operetta, libretto by G. Drovetti after E. Labiche,  1916
Le nozze di Leporello, commedia, libretto by L. Almirante), 1924
L’esultanza della stirpe for orchestra
Idillio pastorale for orchestra
La ballata d’Arlecchino for orchestra

References

1859 births
1920s deaths
19th-century classical composers
20th-century classical composers
Italian classical composers
People from the Province of Pavia
Women classical composers
20th-century Italian composers
19th-century Italian composers
20th-century women composers
19th-century women composers